The 1987 British motorcycle Grand Prix was the ninth round of the 1987 Grand Prix motorcycle racing season. It took place on the weekend of 1–2 August 1987 at Donington Park.

Classification

500 cc

References

British motorcycle Grand Prix
British
Motorcycle Grand Prix
August 1987 sports events in the United Kingdom